This is a list of compositions by Alexander Scriabin.

The list is categorized by Genre, with Piano works organized by style of piece. The list can be sorted by Opus number and WoO number (mostly early works published posthumously) and Anh number (mostly fragmentary works), by clicking on the "Opus" header of the table. Sorted in this Opus/WoO/Anh order, duplicate entries (those listed initially under more than one genre) are moved to the bottom of the list with the unused genre headers.

The majority of Scriabin's works have opus numbers. His work can be divided into three (somewhat arbitrary) periods, based on increasing atonality: early, 1883–1902 (Opp. 1–29); middle, 1903–1909 (Opp. 30–58); and late, 1910–1915 (Opp. 59–74). The development of Scriabin's style can be traced in his ten published sonatas for piano. The first four are in the Romantic style. Initially the music is reminiscent of Chopin, but Scriabin's unique voice, present from the beginning, becomes fully present even in these early pieces. With the fourth and fifth sonatas, Scriabin explored more complex, chromatic harmonies. Each of the following sonatas are often highly dissonant and have a new form of tonality that some describe as atonal and others describe as simply different from conventional tonality. Vers la flamme was intended to be the eleventh sonata, but he was forced to publish it early due to financial concerns. Most of Scriabin's sonatas consist of only a single movement; the first and third are the only ones with multiple movements typical of the sonata form.

List of compositions

References

Sources
 Bowers, Faubion (1969,1996). Scriabin, a Biography. (2nd, revised ed.)  New York: Dover Publications. . (Includes a catalogue of compositions.)
 Mitchell, Edward (1927). Scriabin. "The great Russian tone poet". A complete catalogue of his piano compositions with thematic illustrations. Introduction and notes. 36pp. London: Hawkes & Son, Ltd. (Lists piano compositions with opus numbers.)

External links
 An extensive collection of free scores of compositions by Alexander Scriabin in downloadable PDF format is available from the International Music Score Library Project (IMSLP):
 Alphabetical list of compositions  with links to download pages
 List by opus number with links to download pages
 Fairly complete list of works from the Scriabin Society

 
Scriabin, Alexander, compositions by
Scriabin